Brampton Halt railway station was a railway station located in the Brampton area of Newcastle-under-Lyme, Staffordshire, England. It was opened by the North Staffordshire Railway (NSR) in 1905 but was short-lived, closing in April 1923, just prior to the amalgamation of the NSR into the London, Midland & Scottish Railway.

Present day

It is now realigned for road usage and the former site is now lost under Brampton Sidings Industrial Estate.

References

Links to pictures
Pictures of Level Crossing near to the former station

Disused railway stations in Staffordshire
Railway stations in Great Britain closed in 1923
Railway stations in Great Britain opened in 1905
Newcastle-under-Lyme
Former North Staffordshire Railway stations
1905 establishments in England
1923 disestablishments in England